Rwandan plane crash may refer to:

 Assassination of Juvénal Habyarimana and Cyprien Ntaryamira,1994, triggering the Rwandan genocide
 RwandAir Flight 205, 2009, crashed at Kigali airport